Malinovo refers to the following places:

 Malinovo, Gabrovo Province, village in Bulgaria
 Malinovo, Lovech Province, village in Bulgaria
 Malinovo, Slovakia, village in Slovakia